For the Best and for the Onion is a 2008 Nigerien documentary film about onion farmers in Galmi, Niger, written and directed by Sani Elhadj Magori.

Synopsis
Filmed in the director's hometown over the course of a single growing season, the film follows how the price of onions affects the lives of two young villagers who wish to wed, while the father of the would-be bride, Yaro, struggles to make enough from his crop to be able to offer his daughter a fitting marriage.

Awards and festivals
 2008, Prix Jean Rouch, Forum Africain du Film Documentaire de Niamey
 2009, International Jury Prize and Prix du jury jeunes lycéen, Festival international de films sur la ruralité de Ville-sur-Yron (France)
 2009, African Movie Academy Awards, Best Documentary Feature
 2009, Terra di Tutti Film Festival (Italy), Best Foreign Film Award
 2010, Pan African Film & Arts Festival (Los Angeles), Best Short Documentary
 2010 Cannes Film Festival, Selected to Cinémas du monde section

References

External links

Best Documentary Africa Movie Academy Award winners
Nigerien documentary films
Onions
2008 films
2008 documentary films
Documentary films about agriculture
Agriculture in Niger
Documentary films about families